Mount Lyell is a mountain located in the Shire of Wyndham-East Kimberley in the Kimberley region of Western Australia.

References

Mountains of Western Australia
Kimberley (Western Australia)